Sean Foley (born 21 November 1964) is a British director, writer, comedian and actor. Following early success as part of the comedy double act The Right Size and their long-running stage show The Play What I Wrote, Foley has more recently become a director, including of several West End comedy productions.

Early career and The Right Size

Foley and Hamish McColl formed The Right Size in 1988. They devised and performed in the shows, with regular creative team collaborators such as director Jozef Houben, designer Alice Power, and songwriter Chris Larner. Their style combined elements of clowning, physical comedy, mime, slapstick, vaudeville and variety. The Right Size's major successes were Do You Come Here Often?, about two strangers stuck in a bathroom for 25 years, and The Play What I Wrote, a tribute to Morecambe and Wise. The Right Size were active until 2006.

Acting
Foley has played some major parts in traditional scripted roles, including Freud in Hysteria by Terry Johnson at Birmingham Rep in 2007, and the single role in the film of Samuel Beckett's Act Without Words I directed by Karel Reisz. He appeared alongside Mark Rylance in I Am Shakespeare at the Minerva Theatre, Chichester in 2007. He acted at the Oxford Youth Theatre before his time at the University of Oxford, where he studied history.

On television, he appeared as pub owner Jeff in all twelve episodes of the BBC One sitcom Wild West (2002–2004), playing opposite Dawn French and Catherine Tate. He then starred alongside Tate in the episode "The Patter of Tiny Feet" of the BBC Three comedy horror anthology series Twisted Tales (2005), and also directed The Catherine Tate Show Live tour years later in 2016.

Writing and directing
Foley made his stage directorial debut in 2007 with Pinter's People. He then directed several stage shows by stand-up comedians including Joan Rivers, Nina Conti and Armstrong and Miller.

He achieved significant West End success in 2012, when he directed productions of The Ladykillers (for which he was nominated for the 2012 Laurence Olivier Award for Best Director) and Joe Orton's What the Butler Saw.  He also, with Patrick Barlow, co-directed and co-wrote a four-actor stage adaptation of Ben Hur at the Watermill Theatre, a regional English theatre.

In 2013, Foley made his Royal Shakespeare Company debut, directing Thomas Middleton's A Mad World, My Masters. The production was well received by UK critics.

It was announced in June 2013 that Foley would be directing Matthew MacFadyen and Stephen Mangan in a theatrical adaptation of P. G. Wodehouse's Jeeves and Wooster stories, to be titled Perfect Nonsense, at the Duke of York's Theatre, London, from 30 October 2013. Foley also directed the X Factor stage musical, I Can't Sing! The X Factor Musical, which premiered in 2014.

Foley adapted and directed The Painkiller starring Kenneth Branagh and Rob Brydon during the Kenneth Branagh season at the Garrick Theatre in the West End in March 2016. He also adapted Eugène Ionesco's Amédée, or How to Get Rid of It starring Josie Lawrence and Trevor Fox in March 2017 at the Birmingham Repertory Theatre. He directed his and Phil Porter's adaptation of Molière's The Miser starring Griff Rhys Jones, Lee Mack and Mathew Horne at the Garrick Theatre which was nominated for a 2018 Olivier Award for Best New Comedy. He also directed Noël Coward's Present Laughter for Chichester Festival Theatre in April 2018 starring Rufus Hound as Garry Essendine with Katherine Kingsley and Tracy Ann Oberman.

Foley also adapted and directed The Man in the White Suit for the stage, starring Stephen Mangan and Kara Tointon, beginning at the Theatre Royal, Bath for three weeks before transferring to the Wyndham's Theatre in London's West End from 9 October until 7 December 2019.

In February 2020, Foley directed The Upstart Crow by Ben Elton, based on the BBC TV series with David Mitchell reprising his role as William Shakespeare at the Gielgud Theatre, London. The production was nominated for a Laurence Olivier Award for Best Entertainment or Comedy Play. However, due to the COVID-19 pandemic, the production closed early. The production will be revived at the Apollo Theatre, London from 23 September to 3 December 2022.

Artistic Director of the Birmingham Repertory Theatre 
In March 2019 it was announced that Foley was appointed to become artistic director of Birmingham Repertory Theatre succeeding Roxana Silbert. Foley's inaugural season was due to start in 2020 however, due to the COVID-19 pandemic it began in autumn 2021. 

Foley's first production as director was a revival of his play The Play What I Wrote from 27 November 2021 until 1 January 2022, followed by The COVID-19 Variations: A Piano Drama composed by Richard Thomas, created by Alison Jackson and performed by Philip Edward Fisher from 8 to 9 February 2022.

In February 2023 he will direct Spitting Image Live, based on the TV series, co-written by himself, Al Murray and Matt Forde.

Awards and nominations

Olivier Awards
Winner
 1999 Best Entertainment, Do You Come Here Often
 2002 Best Comedy, The Play What I Wrote

Nominations
 2002 Best Actor (with Hamish McColl), The Play What I Wrote
 2006 Best Entertainment, Ducktastic
 2010 Best Entertainment, Arturo Brachetti: Change
 2012 Best Director, The Ladykillers
 2012 Best New Play, The Ladykillers
2018 Best New Comedy, The Miser

Tony Awards

Nominations
 2003 Best Special Theatrical Event, The Play What I Wrote

Selected other work

Television
Spine Chillers
Wild West
Happiness
People Like Us
The Fitz
Brass Eye

Radio
 The Remains of Foley and McColl
 Foley and McColl Again
 The Goldfish Bowl

Film
Mindhorn (2016)

References

External links
 
 
 

Alumni of the University of Oxford
English male comedians
British directors
English male stage actors
Living people
People from Cleethorpes
1964 births